Plummer may refer to:

Places

Communities
Plummer, Idaho, United States
Plummer, Indiana, United States
Plummer, Minnesota, United States
Plummer Additional, Ontario, Canada

Buildings
Plummer Building, Rochester, Minnesota, United States
Plummer Memorial Library, Newton, Massachusetts, United States

Streets and parks
Plummer Park, West Hollywood, California, United States
Plummer Avenue, historic district in New Waterford, Nova Scotia, Canada

Natural landmarks
Plummer (crater), impact crater on the Moon
Plummer Glacier, Heritage Range, Antarctica
Plummer Peak, Tatoosh Range, Washington, United States

Medicine
Plummer's nail, separation of the nail from the nail bed
Plummer syndrome, development of a toxic nodular goiter
Plummer–Vinson syndrome, a human disorder linked to iron deficiency anemia
Henry Stanley Plummer, an American internist and endocrinologist

Other
Plummer (surname)
Plummer block, method of mounting bearings on a rotating shaft
Plummer House (disambiguation), any of several historic houses
Plummer model, mathematical model in dynamical systems
Plummer Terrier, breed of dog

See also

 
 Plumer (disambiguation)
 Plumber (disambiguation)
 
 Plum (disambiguation)